Canute II may refer to:

 Canute II of Sweden,  king of Sweden from 1229 to 1234
 Canute the Great, king of Denmark and of England as Canute I (died in 1035)